Erica peltata (the ker-ker heath or raasheath) is a species of Erica heath endemic to the fynbos region of the Western Cape Province, South Africa.

Description
It is an erect shrub which flowers in late summer (December to April). The numerous flowers are small (2 mm long) and reddish-pink, with a cup-shaped corolla.

Distribution
This species occurs on the south-facing hills and lower mountains slopes from Riviersonderend in the west, around Swellendam, Heidelberg and Riversdale, to George and Humansdorp in the east.

References

peltata
Flora of South Africa
Taxa named by Henry Cranke Andrews